The Maule M-4 is an American four-seat cabin monoplane designed by Belford Maule and built by the Maule Aircraft Company.

Design and development
The design of the M-4 was started in 1956 by Belford Maule and the prototype Bee Dee first flew in February 1957. Maule started the Maule Aircraft Company to develop and build the aircraft in Napoleon, Michigan as the Maule M-4. The first M-4 flew on September 8, 1960. The M-4 is a steel-tube and fabric high-wing braced-monoplane with a cantilever tailplane with a single fin and rudder. It has a fixed tailwheel landing gear, and the prototype was powered by a nose-mounted 145 hp (108 kW) Continental O-300 engine. It has an enclosed cabin with two rows of side-by-side seating for a pilot and three passengers. The prototype first flew on September 8, 1961 and production started in 1963. Other variants were introduced including the Rocket which is powered by a 210 hp (157 kW) Continental IO-360-A engine, a deluxe Franklin-powered M-4 Astro-Rocket and a Franklin-powered Rocket which is known as the M-4 Strata-Rocket.

A STOL variant of the Strata Rocket was developed as the Maule M-5 Lunar Rocket.

Variants
Bee Dee
Prototype with a  Continental O-300-A piston engine, 11 built.
M-4 Jetasen
Production version of the earlier Maule Bee Dee with  Continental O-300A piston engine, 94 built.
M-4C Jetasen
Fitted with a cargo door, 11 built.
M-4S
Upgraded equipment, three built.
M-4T
Dual-control trainer without rear-seats or rear-entry door, three built.
M-4-180C Astro-Rocket
M-4C with a  Franklin 6A-335-1A engine, seven built.
M-4-210 Rocket
M-4 with a  Continental IO-360-A engine, 45 built.
M-4-210C Rocket
M-4-210 fitted with a cargo door, 117 built.
M-4-220C Strata Rocket
M-4C with a  Franklin 6A-350-C1 engine, 190 built.
M-4-220S
M-4S with a  Franklin 6A-350-C1 engine, one built.
SADASA Cuahtemoc M-1
License-built M-4 with a  Lycoming O-360 engine, three built.

Specifications (M-4-220C Strata Rocket)

References

Citations

Bibliography
 
 

1950s United States sport aircraft
M-04
Single-engined tractor aircraft
High-wing aircraft
Aircraft first flown in 1960